A mara (or marabunta) is a form of gang originating in the United States, which spread to Central American countries such as El Salvador, Honduras and Guatemala.

Definition of mara
A mara is regarded as a group of delinquents of Latin America origin who reside in the United States but have spread towards Central America; namely, in the countries belonging to the Northern Triangle of Central America: Honduras, El Salvador and Guatemala. The maras are not just Central American phenomena; they are transnational. A mara has an organizational structure in which there is a leader in charge of a cadre which, in turn, branches in several cadres. Each of these sub-groups has internal functions such as recruiting followers for drug trafficking, logistics; attacks; intelligence, collection and propaganda, murder, and extortion among other criminal activities. Although each mara has its internal rule, violence action is the most apparent characteristic of this multi-ethnic group.

History: origin and background
In October 1979, the Governing Junta made up of civilians and army officers disintegrated in El Salvador because its civilian members resigned due to their failure to reach agreement on reforms and their inability to bring the military under control. The civil war broke out in 1980. It was characterized by extreme violence including the terrorizing and targeting of civilians by death squads and recruitment of child soldiers. As a result of this armed conflict in Central America, Salvadorans fled to the US and settled in a ghetto in Los Angeles. There, they encountered other migrants from Latin America but the ones that more ferociously fought them and discriminated against them were the Mexican. Salvadorans were poorly educated and found it difficult to land a job. They found themselves in a city already structured according to gang organizations. As they felt excluded from this criminal structured society, they had no other choice than to get together to form their own gang. There are two main mafia groups known as maras in Los Angeles: 18th Street and Mara Salvatrucha or MS-13. Their main feature is the extreme violence with which they perpetrate their criminal acts. The maras are involved in criminal actions, such as murder, rape and all kinds of brutal criminal activities. They are recognizable by their eccentric tattoos spread on their entire bodies. Members of the maras had been deported to their countries of origin after having served their penalties in the US. Once in their mother country, they continued their criminal activity forming gangs that function as branches of those in America resulting in a great security problem for the Latin American governments.

Maras in the US and in Central and Latin America
Maras have transnational roots closely linked to migratory patterns related to the longest and second-longest civil wars in Latin American history; particularly in Guatemala and El Salvador from 1960 to 1996 and from 1980 to 1992 respectively. These armed conflicts caused thousands of Central Americans to leave their home countries, migrating up north, especially (but not exclusively) to Los Angeles in the United States. Youth gangs have existed since the 1960s and 1970s in Central America. The maras are a more recent phenomenon with transnational origins.

18th Street 
The 18th Street gang, commonly known as M-18, is a transnational criminal organization. This gang emerged in the 1960 and was formed by mainly Mexican immigrants, and then migrants coming from El Salvador and Guatemala. Thousands of Central Americans left their countries and fled to other places, especially to Los Angeles in the United States, when a civil war broke out in El Salvador.

Mara Salvatrucha 
Mara Salvatrucha, also known as M-13, is an international criminal gang that emerged in Los Angeles, California in the second half of the 1980s.  This gang was founded by Salvadoran migrants. Over time, Mara Salvatrucha grew rapidly in size. Mara Salvatrucha members compete with the earlier existing M-18. As a transnational gang, they have a high degree of organization in their criminal activities.

Activities
Maras activities range from arms trafficking, assault, auto theft, burglaries, drug trafficking, extortion, human trafficking, identity fraud, identity theft, illegal gambling, illegal immigration, kidnapping, money laundering, people smuggling, prostitution, racketeering, robbery and vandalism. Almost all maras display tattoos on their bodies as a sign of their affiliation to their gang. "La vida por las maras" or "[the] Life for the gang" is a very commonly used phrase by these gangs.

Rivalries
The best known maras are Mara Salvatrucha and their rivals Calle 18. Maras were hunted by death squads including Sombra Negra.

Democracy and problems in the three levels of security: national security, public security and citizen security
The maras increasingly arm their members with heavier weapons, including M-16s, AK-47s, and grenades, which the mara are reportedly improving their skills at using.

The maras have posed a threat to many institutions, such as governments, legal systems and the police, and have wreaked havoc on three levels of security -national security, public security and citizen security. Not only are the maras believed to be penetrating the police force, political groups and non-governmental organizations in all the countries in which they develop, but they also have established small businesses and competed unfairly since they use violence against competitors . As a consequence,  the Central American democracies are seriously jeopardized. Three levels of security are at risk in Central America.

National security  
It refers to the security of the nation-state and safeguarding the state's sovereignty over the territory and population inside its borders through the police force.

Public security  
It is to do with the government intends to maintain the necessary civil order for the development of basic societal functions such as commerce, transport and communications.

Citizen security  
It alludes to the efforts of the national government to secure the exercise of the economic, political and civil right on the part of the citizens.

Measures taken by the governments to protect the citizens from the maras
In 2003, in Honduras, the president responded to the mara problem by forcing a change in the country’s penal code, establishing a maximum 12-year  sentence for gang membership and he increased the sentence to 30 years and put the army on the street to support the nation’s 8,000 police officers.

The draconian anti-gang legislation in El Salvador is known as the Super Hard Hand “Super Mano Dura”. It consists of Salvadoran authorities arresting youths simply for having gang-related tattoos or flashing signs. Moreover, gang members have to serve up to five years in prison and gang leaders up to nine. 

The Guatemalan Congress has passed an anti-gang law based on army troops' presence supporting neighborhoods invaded by gangs in Guatemala City. 

In Panama, in contrast, the government has implemented a program called Friendly Hand ("Mano Amiga") aimed at giving at-risk youngsters positive alternatives to being a gang member. They resorted to theatre programs and sport activities.

At the international level, in January 2004, Guatemalan, Salvadoran, Honduran, Nicaraguan, and Dominican Republic officials joined to create a criminal organizations database to better track movements of the maras in the region. 

In June 2004, at the Summit of Central American Presidents, a plan to combat the maras known as "Plan Centroamerica Segura" Central America Security Plan was proposed. 

In 2005 the "Anti-mara Summit" was held. Finally, the governments of the region are in constant coordination to redress the problem of organized crime in Central America.

An MS-13 gang member
The main target of mara gangs are at-risk youngsters who spend all day long alone in their houses because their parents, who are low-paid workers, have to work hard to make ends meet. These teenagers start to be in contact with gang members since they are in the streets without parental control. Additionally, they are poor and the maras show how easy it is to get money, luxurious cars and expensive stuff by resorting to violence.

Gerardo Lopez  
Gerardo Lopez is part Mexican and Argentinian and born in L.A. He grew up in gang territory in Los Angeles, California. When he joined the Mara gang, he was just 14 years old. There, he gained a reputation for adopting maras’ behaviours and criminal acts. As a result he was imprisoned till his 20s. After that, he decided to quit the gang. He struggled against prejudice and discrimination to achieve his goal of being part of the civil society again. He studied with this purpose in mind so that by following his objective he succeeded in it. Nowadays, he asserts that leaving a gang is possible if one is supported by persons interested in giving them hope and opportunities. Gerardo Lopez is currently the executive director of "Homies Unidos" in Denver which is a gang violence prevention and intervention organization.

See also
 Mara 18
 Mara Salvatrucha (MS-13 from Los Angeles)
 Vatos Locos

References

External links
 "How street gangs took Central America"—Foreign Affairs
 BBC news - Combating El Salvador's gangs
 Peetz, Peter (2008): Youth, Crime, and the Responses of the State: Discourses on Violence in Costa Rica, El Salvador, and Nicaragua, GIGA Working Papers, No. 80
 "I was an MS-13 gang member" TED Conferences - Lopez Gerardo
 Homies Unidos.org - Lopez Gerardo

Gangs in El Salvador
Gangs in Guatemala
Gangs in Honduras
Gangs in the United States
Hispanic gangs
Hispanic-American gangs
Latino street gangs